This is a list of things named after Pierre de Fermat, a French amateur mathematician.

Fermat–Apollonius circle
Fermat–Catalan conjecture
Fermat cubic
Fermat curve
Fermat–Euler theorem
Fermat number
Fermat point
Fermat–Weber problem
Fermat polygonal number theorem
Fermat polynomial
Fermat primality test
Fermat pseudoprime
Fermat quintic threefold
Fermat quotient
Fermat's difference quotient
Fermat's factorization method
Fermat's Last Theorem
Fermat's little theorem
Fermat's method
Fermat's method of descent
Fermat's principle
Fermat's right triangle theorem
Fermat's spiral
Fermat's theorem (stationary points)
Fermat's theorem on sums of two squares
Fermat theory
Pell–Fermat equation

Other
Fermat (computer algebra system)
Fermat (crater)
Fermat Prize

Fermat